She Came Like the Wind (Swedish: Hon kom som en vind) is a 1952 Swedish drama film directed by Hampe Faustman and starring Åke Grönberg, Margit Carlqvist and Britta Brunius. The film's sets were designed by the art director Nils Nilsson.

Cast
 Åke Grönberg as Fabian Rosander
 Margit Carlqvist as 	Lilly Lilja
 Britta Brunius as Olga Rosander
 Arne Källerud as 	Karlsson
 Bengt Eklund as 	Gurra
 Gunnar Hellström as 	Olle
 Barbro Nordin as 	Ingrid
 Sigyn Sahlin as 	Brända brallisen
 Stig Johanson as 	Jansson 
 Astrid Bodin as 	Mrs. Jansson
 Georg Skarstedt as 	Man at the party
 Birger Lensander as 	Arvid
 Bengt Sundmark as 	Foreman
 Gösta Holmström as 	Tidskrivaren
 Ulf Johansson as Listmannen
 Sven-Axel Carlsson as 	Warehouse worker 
 Hampe Faustman as 	Funfair visitor 
 Topsy Håkansson as 	Dancer 
 Tor Isedal as Telegraph operator 
 Nina Scenna as 	Customer 
 Hanny Schedin as 	Mrs. Boman

References

Bibliography 
 Sundholm, John . Historical Dictionary of Scandinavian Cinema. Scarecrow Press, 2012.

External links 
 

1952 films
Swedish drama films
1952 drama films
1950s Swedish-language films
Films directed by Hampe Faustman
1950s Swedish films